The Yellowstone Main Post Office in Yellowstone National Park was built in Mammoth Hot Springs as part of a facilities improvement program by the United States Post Office Department (USPOD).  The post office in Yellowstone was nominated to the National Register of Historic Places as part of a thematic study comprising twelve Wyoming post offices built to standardized USPOD plans in the early twentieth century.  The Yellowstone facility is an understated classical structure with a low hipped roof and rounded dormers that uses a plan and a basic design vocabulary similar to that used in other post offices in the program.  However it also includes restrained French Renaissance Revival elements, the only post office in the western United States to merge these two styles.It is somewhat at odds with the prevailing design theme expressed in other buildings in the former Fort Yellowstone district.  The Yellowstone Main Post Office is also a contributing property to the Mammoth Hot Springs Historic District.

References

External links

Yellowstone Main Post Office at the Wyoming State Historic Preservation Office

1936 establishments in Wyoming
Buildings and structures in Yellowstone National Park in Wyoming
Government buildings completed in 1936
National Register of Historic Places in Park County, Wyoming
National Register of Historic Places in Yellowstone National Park
Post office buildings on the National Register of Historic Places in Wyoming
Stripped Classical architecture in the United States